Bronco Buster is an American wheelstander exhibition funny car built by Doug Nash.

Nash built Bronco Buster for NHRA's new A/FX (A/Factory Experimental) class,  a precursor to Funny Car, which debuted in 1965. It was based on a 1966 Ford Bronco, with a reproduction two-piece body, fitted over an aluminum tube chassis; the cab, hood, and front fenders came off in one piece for easy maintenance.

It was powered by the same  Ford V8 Nash used in his previous B/FX car. (It is rumored Nash turned down a SOHC 427 “cammer” so he could keep the four-speed manual transmission, instead of switching to a C4 automatic.)

Bronco Buster was popular on the match racing circuit, until NHRA banned aluminum chassis (in favor of steel) and Jeep and pickup bodies, following the success of Gene Conway in the hemi Jeep funny car Destroyer, in 1967.

Bronco Buster was the centerfold in Drag Strip's  February 1967 issue, as well as appearing on the cover in an inset photo.

Notes

Sources 
Burgess, Phil, NHRA National Dragster Editor. “Remembering Doug Nash”, written 24 July 2015, at NHRA.com (retrieved 23 May 2017)
McClurg, Bob.  "50 Years of Funny Cars:  Part 2" in Drag Racer, November 2016, pp. 35–50.
Wallace, Dave. "50 Years of Funny Cars: Part 1" in Drag Racer, November 2016, pp. 21–32.

Ford vehicles
1960s cars
Drag racing cars
Rear-wheel-drive vehicles